Ellen Uuspõld (19 April 1927 – 7 June 2019) was an Estonian linguist.

In 1953 she graduated from Tartu University in Estonian philology. Since 1967 she taught at the University of Tartu. From 1980 until 1983, she taught the Estonian language at Tampere University.

Her scientific work was focused on the structure of Estonian language.

Awards
 1996: Tartu University's Big Medal
 2000: Wiedemann Language Award
 2004: Order of the White Star, V class.

Works
 1966 "Määrusliku des-, mata-, nud- (nuna-) ja tud- (tuna-) konstruktsiooni struktuur ja tähendus" E. Uuspõld
 1973 "Eesti keele tekste ja harjutusi vene üliõpilastele. 1. vihik" E. Uuspõld, A. Valmet and E. Turu
 1981 "Eesti keele tekste ja harjutusi vene üliõpilastele. 2. vihik" E. Uuspõld, A. Valmet and E. Turu
 1981 "Eesti keele õpik = Учебник эстонского языка" E. Uuspõld, A. Valmet and E. Turu
 1982 "Viron verbien infiniittisten rakenteiden subjektisääntöjä" E. Uuspõld
 1984 "Johannes Aavik viron kirjakielen uudistajana" E. Uuspõld
 1992 "Viron transitiiviverbien syntaksist" E. Uuspõld
 1993 "Eesti keele õpik kõrgkoolidele = Учебник эстонского языка для вузов" E. Uuspõld, A. Valmet and E. Turu
 1966 "Eesti keele õpik = Учебник эстонского языка" E. Uuspõld, A. Valmet and E. Turu
 1997 "Pühendusteos Huno Rätsepale" E.Uuspõld, A. Valmet and E. Turu
 2001 "Популярная грамматика эстонского языка. Eesti keele grammatiline vormistik. Moodustamine ja kasutamine" E. Uuspõld and A. Valmet
 2002 "Õpetusi ja harjutusi algajale keeletoimetajale" E. Uuspõld and A. Mund
 2004 "Üliõpilastööde vormistamise juhend" E. Uuspõld

References

1927 births
2019 deaths
Linguists from Estonia
Estonian philologists
University of Tartu alumni
Academic staff of the University of Tartu
Academic staff of the University of Tampere
People from Narva-Jõesuu
Recipients of the Order of the White Star, 5th Class